Arnaut is a Turkish ethnonym used to denote Albanians. Arvanid, Arnavud, plural: Arnavudlar: modern Turkish: Arnavut, plural: Arnavutlar; are ethnonyms used mainly by Ottoman and contemporary Turks for Albanians with Arnavutça being called the Albanian language.

Etymology
The original Greek ethnonym Άλβανίτης (approx. "Albanítis"), derived from Άλβάνος ("Albános"), became Άρβανίτης "Árvanítis" in Modern Greek. The pronunciation of "β" changed from /b/ in ancient Greek to /v/ in Byzantine Greek. This is reflected in the Turkish term, Arnavut or Arnaut, by ways of metathesis (-van- to -nav-). A related Greek term is Arvanites.

The Ottoman Turks borrowed their name for Albanians after hearing it from the Byzantine Greeks.

Usage

Ethnic marker
During the Ottoman era, the name was used for ethnic Albanians regardless of their religious affiliations, just like it is today.

In the late eighteenth and early nineteenth centuries, due to socio-political disturbances by some Albanians in the Balkans, the term was used as an ethnic marker for Albanians in addition to the usual millet religious terminology to identify people in Ottoman state records. While the term used in Ottoman sources for the country was Arnavudluk (آرناوودلق) for areas such as modern Albania, Western Macedonia, Southern Serbia, Kosovo, parts of northern Greece and southern Montenegro. In modern Turkish Arnavutluk refers only to the Republic of Albania.

Transfer to other languages
The term Arnā'ūṭ (الأرناؤوط) also entered the Arabic language as an exonym for Albanian communities that settled in the Levant during the Ottoman era onward, especially for those residing in Syria. The term Arnaut (Арнаут), plural: Arnauti (Арнаути) has also been borrowed into Balkan South Slavic languages like Bulgarian and within Serbian the term has also acquired pejorative connotations regarding Albanians.

In Ukraine, Albanians who lived in Budzhak and who later also settled in the Azov Littoral of Zaporizhzhia Oblast are also known as Arnaut. The city of Odesa has two streets: Great Arnaut Street and Little Arnaut Street.

Albanian Ottoman soldiers
Historically used as an exonym, the Turkish term Arnaut has also been used for instance by some Western Europeans as a synonym for Albanians that were employed as soldiers in the Ottoman army. In Romanian arnăut was used in a similar way, since at least the eighteenth century, for Albanian mercenaries dressed in traditional garb and hired either by the rulers of the Romanian principalities for their court guards, or by the boyars as bodyguards.

See also

Names of the Albanians and Albania
Albania (placename)
Albanians in Turkey
Albanians in Ukraine
Albania under the Ottoman Empire
Arvanites
Turco-Albanians
Albanophobia

References

Bibliography

Turkish words and phrases
Albanian people